A sternal saw is a bone cutter used to perform median sternotomy, opening the patient's chest by splitting the breastbone, or sternum. It is a reciprocating blade saw that resembles a jigsaw in appearance. It was invented and introduced by Dr. Edward P. ("Ted") Diethrich in 1963.

See also
Instruments used in general surgery

References

External links
 

Saws
Surgical instruments